Jack Murdock (September 16, 1930 – September 16, 2007) was an American football coach. He served as the head football coach Westfield State University in Westfield, Massachusetts for four seasons, from 1986 to 1989, compiling a record of 19–18.

Murdock was an assailant football coach at American International College in Springfield, Massachusetts, Holyoke High School in Holyoke, Massachusetts, and Chicopee High School in Chicopee, Massachusetts. He was later the head football coach at Holyoke before moving on Shamokin High School in Shamokin, Pennsylvania, where he served as head football coach for three seasons, from 1983 to 1985.

Murdock was born on September 16, 1930, in Shamokin. He died on September 16, 2007, in Charlotte, Vermont.

Head coaching record

College

References

1930 births
2007 deaths
American International Yellow Jackets football coaches
Westfield State Owls football coaches
High school football coaches in Massachusetts
High school football coaches in Pennsylvania
People from Shamokin, Pennsylvania